Annie Laurie is a 1927 American silent romantic drama film directed by John S. Robertson, released by Metro-Goldwyn-Mayer, and starring Lillian Gish and Norman Kerry. It is about the battles of Scottish clans.

This was the third film of Lillian Gish at MGM, and its poor box office returns marked a decline in the star's career. On a down note Gish stated that her mother became ill during the production of this film and that "...she only showed up for work" as opposed to putting her all into the film. John Wayne makes an early film appearance as a crowd extra.

The film's copyright was renewed, and fell into the public domain on January 1, 2023.

Cast
 Lillian Gish as Annie Laurie
 Norman Kerry as Ian Macdonald
 Creighton Hale as Donald
 Joseph Striker as Alastair
 Hobart Bosworth as The MacDonald Chieftain
 Patricia Avery as Enid
 Russell Simpson as Sandy
 Brandon Hurst as The Campbell Chieftain
 David Torrence as Sir Robert Laurie
 Frank Currier as Cameron of Lochiel
 Richard Alexander as One of the MacDonalds (uncredited)
 Mary Gordon as First Midwife (uncredited)
 Henry Kolker as King's Representative (uncredited)
 Margaret Mann as Second Midwife (uncredited)
 John Wayne as Extra (uncredited)

References

External links

Stills at silentfilmstillarchive.com

1927 films
1920s color films
American black-and-white films
American silent feature films
Metro-Goldwyn-Mayer films
Films directed by John S. Robertson
1927 romantic drama films
American romantic drama films
Silent films in color
Films set in Scotland
1920s historical romance films
American historical romance films
1920s American films
Silent romantic drama films
Silent American drama films
1920s English-language films
Silent historical romance films